Promecarb (chemical formula: C12H17NO2) is a chemical compound previously used as an insecticide.

References

Obsolete pesticides
Carbamate insecticides
Isopropyl compounds
Phenol esters